Oberblegisee is a lake in the Canton of Glarus, Switzerland.

See also
List of mountain lakes of Switzerland

External links

Oberblegisee  report on fishing in the lake
   

Oberblegi
Lakes of the canton of Glarus